The Pucker Up Stakes is an American Thoroughbred horse race for 3-year-old fillies held annually in early September at Arlington Park race track near Chicago, Illinois. A Grade III event, it is contested over a distance of 9 furlongs (1 1/8 miles) on turf.  In 2022, it will be moved to Churchill Downs.

The race was named in honor of Ada L. Rice's filly, Pucker Up. Pucker Up was one of five champions trained by U.S. Racing Hall of Fame trainer James P. Conway.

The race was inaugurated in 1961 and was run on the main track until 1974 and again in 1976. In 1974-5, it was run at  miles; in 1979 and 1986, the distance was  miles.

Winners since 2000

References

 The Pucker Up Stakes at Pedigree Query

Flat horse races for three-year-old fillies
Horse races in Illinois
Turf races in the United States
Recurring sporting events established in 1961
Arlington Park
1961 establishments in Illinois